Peddarikunta is a small village and panchayath headquarter of Peddapanjani mandal, Palamaner taluk, Chittoor district, Andhra Pradesh, India.

In this panchayath there are eight villages:
Chillappalle
Basapuram
Peddarikunta
Chinnarikunta
Gurivireddypalli
Pilligundlapalli
Reddyindlu
Anjaneyapuram

References

Villages in Chittoor district